Mollalı (also, Mollaly) is a village and municipality in the Oghuz Rayon of Azerbaijan.  It has a population of 573.

References 

Populated places in Oghuz District